James Stephen Heappey (born 30 January 1981) is a British politician serving as Minister of State for the Armed Forces since 2022.  A member of the Conservative Party, he has served as the Member of Parliament (MP) for Wells in Somerset since 2015. He was Parliamentary Under-Secretary of State for the Armed Forces from 2020 to 2022, before being promoted to Minister of State in July 2022. Before entering politics he was an officer in the British Army.

Early life 
Heappey was born on 30 January 1981 and spent his early years in Sutton Coldfield, West Midlands, before moving to Nailsea, Somerset. He was privately educated at Queen Elizabeth's Hospital in Bristol and graduated in Political Science from the University of Birmingham.

Military career 

Following university, Heappey attended the Royal Military Academy Sandhurst. On 7 August 2004, he was commissioned in the British Army as a second lieutenant with seniority in that rank from 11 August 2001. As a university graduate, he was immediately promoted to lieutenant on 7 August 2004 with seniority from 11 August 2003. He was promoted to captain on 7 February 2007. Having attended Staff College, he was promoted to major on 31 July 2012. 

He served as an officer in the Royal Gloucestershire, Berkshire and Wiltshire Regiment and then The Rifles, the county regiment for Somerset, in Kabul in 2005, Northern Ireland in 2006, Basra in 2007 and Sangin in Helmand Province in 2009. He also served in Kenya, and in 2011 he was posted to the Ministry of Defence in London, where he worked as executive officer on the General Staff. He retired from the British Army on 2 November 2012 with the rank of major. 

After leaving the British Army, he worked as a researcher for the Conservative MP for North Somerset, Liam Fox.

Political career 

Heappey was first elected as the Member of Parliament (MP) for Wells in the 2015 general election, having been selected as the Conservative Prospective Parliamentary Candidate two years earlier. He used his maiden speech in the House of Commons to encourage the Government to continue addressing the problems that many rural communities face, including poor road connections, limited access to the rail network, weak phone signals and slow broadband speeds.

In October 2015, Heappey succeeded Nick de Bois as the Chair of the All Party Parliamentary Group for the UK Events Industry. He also serves as Vice Chairman of the All Party Parliamentary Group for Rural Business, a group which seeks to secure policy outcomes that promote the sustainable growth of the rural economy.

From July 2015 to October 2016, Heappey served on the House of Commons' Energy and Climate Change Select Committee. He backed the Government's decision to give the go-ahead for the Hinkley Point C nuclear power station, in particular citing the benefits for the local economy of Somerset. Heappey has also called for greater exploitation of the resources and expertise available in the marine energy sector. He expressed disappointment in January 2016 when, despite his lobbying efforts, the Conservative Government approved the construction of a 40-mile stretch of power lines to link the Hinkley Point C power-station and Avonmouth.

In May 2016, it was reported that Heappey was one of a number of Conservative MPs being investigated by police in the United Kingdom general election, 2015 party spending investigation, for allegedly spending more than the legal limit on constituency election campaign expenses. In May 2017, the Crown Prosecution Service said that while there was evidence of inaccurate spending returns, it did not "meet the test" for further action.

Heappey was re-elected at the 2017 general election and served as the Parliamentary Private Secretary to former Secretary of State for Transport Chris Grayling. He chaired the Parliamentary Renewable and Sustainable Energy Group and is a Vice President of the Association for Decentralised Energy.

Although sceptical about some aspects of the European Union, he was opposed to Brexit prior to the 2016 EU membership referendum. He later voted in favour of the Government's timetable to trigger Article 50 of the Treaty on European Union before the end of March 2017. On 15 January 2019 he voted in favour of Theresa May's Brexit deal.

Heappey endorsed Boris Johnson to be leader of the Conservative Party during the 2019 leadership election, and served as his Parliamentary Private Secretary in a job share with Alex Burghart from August to December 2019.

In December 2019, Heappey left the Prime Minister's Office and became Parliamentary Under-Secretary of State for Defence Procurement, a junior ministerial appointment at the Ministry of Defence. In January 2020, Heappey awarded £184m to Ascent Flight Training, a consortium that the National Audit Office had criticised, in September 2019, for its poor performance and failure to meet "contractual obligations".

In February 2020, Johnson appointed Heappey Parliamentary Under-Secretary of State for the Armed Forces as part of a cabinet reshuffle.

In March 2022, Heappey admitted on LBC that despite earning £106,619 a year from his parliamentary salary he was "pretty worried" about going into his overdraft each month.

In April 2022, Heappey said it was legitimate during the 2022 Russian invasion for Ukraine to use British supplied weapons for strikes onto Russian territory.

In July 2022, Heappey was promoted to Minister of State by Johnson. That same month he announced his support for Liz Truss in the Conservative leadership election. In September 2022, following Truss's election, Heappey was re-appointed as a Minister of State in the Ministry of Defence as the Minister for the Armed Forces and Veterans; he was also given the right to attend Truss's Cabinet as part of his role. In October 2022, Heappey said he would resign if Truss reneged on a pledge to raise defence spending to 3% of GDP by 2030.

In October 2022, following Truss's resignation as leader of the Conservative Party, Heappey announced his support for Rishi Sunak, as the next leader of the Conservative Party, despite Sunak's refusal to commit to raise defence spending to 3% of GDP by 2030.

Heappey was re-appointed Minister of State for the Armed Forces by Prime Minister Rishi Sunak on 26 October 2022 but lost the role of Veterans Minister and the right to attend Cabinet to Johnny Mercer.

Scottish referendum incident
During the 2017 general election, he apologised for an incident when meeting the sixth form at Millfield School in Street, Somerset. Heappey asked pupils how they would vote in the proposed second Scottish independence referendum, and a Scottish girl said she would support independence. Some reports asserted that Heappey then asked her "Why don’t you fuck off back to Scotland?", but The Guardian reported Heappey's statement that he told her to "fuck off", but did not say "back to Scotland". In his apology, Heappey said that the comment had been intended as a joke.

The Liberal Democrat candidate for Wells, Tessa Munt, condemned Heappey's use of what she called "bullying, racist and abusive language to dismiss a teenage schoolgirl engaging in political debate." In Scotland, Heappey's conduct was described as "appalling behaviour" by the Scottish National Party leader Nicola Sturgeon, and as "utterly inappropriate" by Ruth Davidson, leader of the Scottish Conservative Party.

Parliamentary Expenses 
Since the beginning of the current Parliament, Heappey has declared three donations totalling £10,500. The largest single item Mr Heappey declared was a donation worth £5,000 from from the businessman, and climate change skeptic, Neil Record.

Heappey also recorded a donations of £2,500 from the Dunchurch Lodge Stud Company and £3,000 from James Drummond.

Personal life 
Heappey lives in London and the Somerset town of Axbridge with his wife Kate and two children.

Honours

Notes

References

External links 
 

1981 births
Military personnel from Birmingham, West Midlands
Graduates of the Staff College, Camberley
Living people
21st-century British Army personnel
Alumni of the University of Birmingham
Conservative Party (UK) MPs for English constituencies
Graduates of the Royal Military Academy Sandhurst
Parliamentary Private Secretaries to the Prime Minister
People educated at Queen Elizabeth's Hospital, Bristol
People from Axbridge
People from Nailsea
Royal Gloucestershire, Berkshire and Wiltshire Regiment officers
The Rifles officers
UK MPs 2015–2017
UK MPs 2017–2019
UK MPs 2019–present
Members of the Privy Council of the United Kingdom